McKeesport Area High School is a public high school located in McKeesport, Pennsylvania, United States. The school, which is located at 1960 Eden Park Boulevard, serves students from Dravosburg, McKeesport, South Versailles, Versailles, and White Oak. The school is a member of The Consortium for Public Education, which is a member of the Public Education Network.

History

The very first building to be designated solely as a high school in McKeesport was located on Shaw Ave.  In 1916, McKeesport Technical High School, also known as "Tech High" opened on 1600 Cornell St. (back then, it was just a part of the Evans Family Homestead).  In 1961, the high school was relocated to its current location.  The new building was adjacent to the McKeesport Vocational School located on 3600 O'Neil Boulevard.  The two buildings were used jointly for a variety of high school coursework.  In 2000, the 1960 Eden Park Blvd. building (also known as "South Hall") housed all 9-12 grade non-vocational classes.  In 2003, additions to the physical plant enabled the vocational programs to also relocate.  "North Hall" was renamed Founders' Hall and housed 7-8 grade.

When this new high school was completed in September 1961, the School Board named it McKeesport Senior High School.  From 1967 until 1983, the building was known as McKeesport Area Senior High School whereupon the "senior" was dropped in 1984.  From 1984 until now, it has been known as McKeesport Area High School.

The high school  became a Grade 9-12 building with the start of the 1979-1980 school year.  In 2003-2004, new additions to the high school building provided room for the five remaining vocational/technical classes that were previously housed at North Hall.  Culinary Arts, Cosmetology, Building Construction, Auto Body, and Auto Mechanics are now all a part of the comprehensive high school that offers its entire academic and vocational/technical curriculum under one roof.

Highlights of the high school project included a modern Tiger Inn restaurant for the culinary arts program, new cosmetology labs, an expanded graphic occupations department, modern office areas for the vocational/technical program, and an expanded physical fitness area, along with, much needed, additional classroom space.

Upgrades were also made to the Weigle-Schaeffer Tiger Stadium that features a new artificial grass field, and an updated all weather track that includes specialized areas to conduct field events.

McKeesport Area Technology Center Programs

 Allied Health Technology
 Auto Body and Collision
 Auto Mechanics
 Biotechnology
 Blueprint Reading
 Building Construction
 Business/Office Administration
 Child Care
 CISCO IT Essentials/C-Tech Networking
 Computer Aided Design and Drafting
 Computer Service Technology
 Cosmetology
 Culinary Arts
 Engineering Technology
 Graphics/Commercial Art
 Web Page Design

Extracurriculars
The district offers a variety of clubs, activities and sports.

Athletics

McKeesport Area High School competes in the Pennsylvania Interscholastic Athletic Association (PIAA).  It also is a member of the Western Pennsylvania Interscholastic Athletic League (WPIAL).

Baseball
Basketball
Cheerleading
Color Guard
Cross Country
Dance
Football
Golf
Soccer
Softball
Swimming
Tennis
Track
Volleyball
Winter Guard
Wrestling

Athletic  championships
2005:
WPIAL AAAA Football Champions
PIAA AAAA Football Champions
1998:
WPIAL AAAA Girls Basketball Champions.
1995:
WPIAL AAAA Boys Basketball Champions.
1994:
WPIAL AAAA Football Champions.
PIAA AAAA Football Champions.
1963:
WPIAL Baseball Champions.
1955:
WPIAL Baseball Champions.
WPIAL Basketball Champions.
PIAA Basketball Champions.
1953:
WPIAL Baseball Champions.
1945:
WPIAL Baseball Champions.
1925:
WPIAL Basketball Champions.
PIAA Basketball Champions

Organizations and activities

The school's numerous and varied organizations include:

 Band
 Bowling Club
 Chess Club
 Children's Play
 Choir
 Color Guard
 Culinary Arts Club
 Cultural Diversity Club
 Cultural Heritage Club
 Environmental Club
 Equestrian team
 Foreign Language Club
 Future Business Leaders of America
 Future Nurses of America
 Gay-Straight Alliance
 Interact Club
 Marching band
 Model United Nations
 Musical Theater
 National Honor Society
 Orchestra
 P.A.W.S.S.
 P.E.P.P.
 Powder Puff Football
 PTSA
 Red & Blue Newspaper
 Senior Class
 Skills U.S.A.
 Speech Club
 Stage Crew
 Students Against Driving Drunk/Drug Awareness Committee S.A.D.D.
 Student Council
 Theatre Arts
 Vision Poetry Magazine
 Winter Guard
 Yearbook (Yough-A-Mon)

Notable alumni
Austin Davis Former PA State House of Representatives Member and current Pennsylvania Lieutenant Governor 
Mitchell Paige (1918-2005) -- Colonel, United States Marine Corps, awarded Medal of Honor for actions as a Platoon Sergeant in the defense of Henderson Field on Guadalcanal Island, 26 October 1942.  McKeesport HS Class of 1936
Swin Cash - Women's Professional Basketball Player (WNBA), 2 time (2000, 2002) NCAA Women's College Basketball Champion (UCONN), Olympic (Basketball, 2004) Gold medalist.
Rick Krivda - former Professional Baseball player (MLB,1991–2003), Olympic (Baseball, 2000) Gold Medalist,
Tim Conroy – former MLB pitcher,
Brian Holton – former MLB relief pitcher,
Khaleke Hudson - NFL player
Tom Qualters – former MLB pitcher,
Mike Logan – former Pittsburgh Steelers safety,
Ray Mathews – former NFL Pro Bowl wide receiver,
Brandon Short - former NY Giants, Carolina Panthers linebacker,
Russell Stuvaints – former Pittsburgh Steelers safety.
Sam Sneed – music producer,
Helen Richey – first woman pilot of a commercial airliner,
Herbert Spiegel – psychiatrist, "father of hypnosis",
Robert J. Stevens – chairman, president and chief executive officer of Lockheed Martin,
Donald M. Carpenter – aviator in the U.S. Navy,
Harry Fisher (aka Franklin J. Phillips) – United States Marine and Medal of Honor recipient,
Duane Michals - Artist and photographer
Freddie Lewis - former NBA/ABA Guard (ABA All-Star)
Van Dyke Parks - musician

References

External links
McKeesport Area High School Official Home Page.
McKeesport Area School District Official Web Site.
McKeesport Area Tiger Athletics
McKeesport Area Senior High Class of 1976.

Educational institutions established in 1884
Public high schools in Pennsylvania
Schools in Allegheny County, Pennsylvania
Education in Pittsburgh area
McKeesport, Pennsylvania
1884 establishments in Pennsylvania